Tim Mullen (born 28 March 1976 in Portadown, Northern Ireland) is a British racing driver. After starting his career in Karting, he entered the Irish Formula Ford championship in 1995 where he won the title. Moving to the British Formula Vauxhall Junior series the following year, he again took the honours as well as being selected as a finalist for the prestigious McLaren Autosport Young Driver of the Year award.

He spent the next few years competing with success in Formula Renault and Formula Palmer Audi before moving to the British GT Championship where he became champion in 2006. He previously competed in the FIA GT Championship with CRS Racing driving a Ferrari Scuderia GT3.

24 Hours of Le Mans results

References

External links

CRS Racing Website
FIA GT Driver Bio

1976 births
Living people
Sportspeople from County Armagh
People from Portadown
Racing drivers from Northern Ireland
Formula Ford drivers
British Formula Renault 2.0 drivers
Formula Palmer Audi drivers
British GT Championship drivers
European Le Mans Series drivers
Blancpain Endurance Series drivers
International GT Open drivers
24 Hours of Spa drivers
Britcar 24-hour drivers

CRS Racing drivers
Nürburgring 24 Hours drivers
24H Series drivers